A Perfect Day is a 2008 Italian drama film directed by Ferzan Özpetek. It is based on a novel with the same name by Melania Mazzucco.

It entered the competition at the 65th Venice International Film Festival.

Plot 
Antonio and Emma have been separated for years, but he does not accept when Emma dates other men. Indeed, Antonio proves obsessive, aggressive and intrusive, and again threatens Emma to hurt the children: little Kevin, shy and introverted, and the adolescent Valentina. Emma tolerates the harassment of Antonio, and the situation seems to recover. However one evening Antonio asks his ex-wife to entrust him with their children for an evening at a pizzeria. Antonio has a diabolical plan, and when he returns home with Kevin and Valentina, he pulls out a gun and shoots both of his children, and finally commits suicide. Emma rushes desperately to them, and discovers that her daughter is still alive.

Cast 
Isabella Ferrari as Emma Tempesta Buonocore
Valerio Mastandrea as Antonio Buonocore
Nicole Grimaudo as Maja Fioravanti
Federico Costantini as Aris Fioravanti
Valerio Binasco as Elio Fioravanti
Monica Guerritore as Mara
Stefania Sandrelli as Olimpia Tempesta
Nicole Murgia as Valentina Buonocore 
Gabriele Paolino as Kevin Buonocore 
Angela Finocchiaro as Silvana 
Giulia Salerno as Camilla Fioravanti
Milena Vukotic as Professoressa di Aris

References

External links

2008 films
Italian drama films
2000s Italian-language films
Films set in Rome
Films directed by Ferzan Özpetek
2000s Italian films
Fandango (Italian company) films